Mahyar Hassan-Nejad (August 6, 1985 in Sari, Iran) is an Iranian footballer who currently plays for Sanat Sari in the Azadegan League.

Club career
Hassan-Nejad joined Sanat Sari in 2010–11 season.

Club career statistics

References

1985 births
People from Sari, Iran
Living people
Saipa F.C. players
Esteghlal F.C. players
Shamoushak Noshahr players
Damash Iranian players
Sanat Sari players
Iranian footballers
Sportspeople from Sari, Iran
Association football goalkeepers